The coat of arms of Dagestan was instituted on 20 October 1994. The eagle is a traditional symbol of nobility, courage, wisdom, and faith.

References

Sources
 Dagestan: Edward Beliaev, Oksana Buranbaeva. Cavendish State Publishing 2005  (Google Books)

Dagestan
Dagestan
Dagestan
Dagestan
Dagestan